Pied flycatcher may refer to several species of birds:

 European pied flycatcher, found in Eurasia and northern and western Africa
 Pied flycatcher, an alternate name for the pied monarch, found in Australia

Birds by common name